Dimitar Kutrovsky (born 27 August 1987) is a retired tennis player from Bulgaria. On 18 May 2015, he reached his highest ATP singles ranking of 293 whilst his best doubles ranking was 234 on 10 August 2015.

As a junior, he played for CSKA. In 2003 he was №28 in the rankings of the European Tennis Association for boys under 16 years old. In 2005 he reached №69 in the ITF's rankings for boys under 18 years old. He is also a doubles champion from the Indoor national championships in 2008, where he was partnering with Martin Shishkov.

He graduated his secondary education in the sport school "General Vladimir Stoychev" in Sofia. After that he also finished his higher education in the University of Texas at Austin, where he played for the American College championships (NCAA). With his 230 wins in singles and doubles, he became the best tennis player in the history of the university. From 2008 to 2010 he was a three-times winner of the annual award "All-American" in singles, which is given to the tennis players with the best results in USA.

After graduating in 2010 Kutrovsky started playing actively in ITF Futures and ATP Challenger tournaments. In singles he played four finals of ITF Futures tournaments and he won one of them. In 2012 he played his second ATP tournament at the 2012 SAP Open and won five matches and reached the quarter-finals, where he lost 1–6, 4–6 to Ryan Harrison. In doubles he has three titles and three lost finals.

After investigations of allegedly using prohibited stimulant methylhexaneamine at the 2012 SAP Open on 14 February 2012 he was found guilty by the International Tennis Federation on 15 May and retroactively banned for two years dating back from the said tournament.

On 5 October 2012 it was announced that the Court of Arbitration for Sport has partially upheld the appeal by Dimitar Kutrovsky against the decision of the independent tribunal dated 15 May 2012. The panel's decision was that the appropriate period of ineligibility should be fifteen months and the Bulgarian will be eligible to participate on 14 May 2013.

As of May 2013 Kutrovsky is back to playing after his ban expired. He reached the final of the clay-court Futures event in Varna, which was his first tournament after the ban, but there he lost 7–5, 4–6, 2–6 to Kristijan Mesaroš.

In January 2016, Kutrovsky announced his retirement from professional tennis.

Year-end rankings

Challenger and Futures Finals

Singles: 11 (2–9)

Doubles: 15 (7–8)

Davis Cup 
Dimitar Kutrovsky debuted for the Bulgaria Davis Cup team in 2011. Since then he has 6 nominations with 6 ties played, his singles W/L record is 6–4 and doubles W/L record is 2–2 (8–6 overall).

Singles (6–4)

Doubles (2–2) 

RPO = Relegation Play–off
PPO = Promotion Play–off

References

External links

 
 
 

Bulgarian male tennis players
Sportspeople from Sofia
1987 births
Living people
Doping cases in tennis
Bulgarian sportspeople in doping cases
Texas Longhorns men's tennis players
21st-century Bulgarian people